Langley Green railway station serves the Langley Green area of Oldbury in Sandwell, in the West Midlands, England.  It is located on the Birmingham to Worcester via Kidderminster Line.  The station is managed by West Midlands Trains, who provide the majority of train services; there are also occasional services provided by Chiltern Railways.

History
The station was opened on 1 May 1885 by the Great Western Railway on their line from Birmingham Snow Hill to Stourbridge Junction. There was also a Great Western Railway branch from here to Oldbury, a larger town to the north. The Oldbury branch closed to passengers on 3 March 1915; and until recently a short stub of the disused line remained in situ. Its platforms can still be seen at Langley Green station.

The line from Smethwick West through to Snow Hill closed in 1972. In the run up to the closure the sparse service to Snow Hill terminated at Langley Green, with Kidderminster services diverted into Birmingham New Street. This continued until 1995 when the line through Snow Hill to Birmingham Moor Street was restored.  Some Hereford and Worcester to New Street trains continued to run via the Smethwick Jcn - Galton Junction curve until May 2004, but the route today is only used for diversions if the normal route to Snow Hill is closed for engineering work.

Services
The typical Monday-Saturday daytime service is every 30 minutes, between Stourbridge Junction and Birmingham Snow Hill, with alternate trains continuing beyond Birmingham to Dorridge or Whitlocks End. Most daytime trains on both routes trains continue through to Stratford-upon-Avon since the winter 2013 timetable change.  Most local services are run by Class 172 Diesel Multiple Unit currently, with the one Chiltern Railways service per day that is run by a Class 168 DMU only.

There are additional services at peak times, though Chiltern Railways services to London Marylebone no longer call. There is one Chiltern Railways service that calls at this station on weekdays only.

References

Further reading

External links

Rail Around Birmingham and the West Midlands: Langley Green station

Railway stations in Sandwell
DfT Category E stations
Former Great Western Railway stations
Railway stations in Great Britain opened in 1885
Railway stations served by Chiltern Railways
Railway stations served by West Midlands Trains
Oldbury, West Midlands